The 1981–82 European Cup was the 17th edition of the European Cup, IIHF's premier European club ice hockey tournament. The season started on October 7, 1981, and finished on August 29, 1982.

The tournament was won by CSKA Moscow, who won the final group.

First round

 SG Dynamo Weißwasser,    
 SC Riessersee   :  bye

Second round

 Kärpät,   
 Färjestads BK,  
 TJ Vitkovice,  
 CSKA Moscow    :  bye

Third round

Final Group
(Düsseldorf, North Rhine-Westphalia, West Germany)

Final group standings

References
 Season 1982

1981–82 in European ice hockey
IIHF European Cup